Abrostola canariensis is a moth of the family Noctuidae. It is endemic to the Canary Islands.

References 

Plusiinae
Moths of Africa
Moths described in 1913